Danaphos is an oceanic  ray-finned fish genus which belongs in the family Sternoptychidae. A common name is bottlelights.

Species
There are currently two recognized species in this genus:
 Danaphos asteroscopus Bruun, 1931
 Danaphos oculatus (Garman, 1899) (Bottlelights, Bigeye Lightfish)

Fossils of bottlelights show that the genus was already distinct in the Late Eocene, more than 35 million years ago.

References

Sternoptychidae
Extant Eocene first appearances
Marine fish genera
Taxa named by Anton Frederik Bruun